The Principal Stakes (in Japanese: プリンシパルステークス), is a race for three-year-old stallions and mares in the Japan Racing Association.

Race Details

The race was established in 1996 as a qualifying race for the Tokyo Yūshun. The winner of this race will be given Priority entry rights to the Japanese Derby. To those who wish to qualify for Tokyo Yūshun, winning this race is normally the final chance.

It is an international race, typically held in May.

Winners since 2014

Past winners

Past winners include:

See also
 Horse racing in Japan
 List of Japanese flat horse races

References

Horse races in Japan